Werner Stocker (April 7, 1955 – May 27, 1993) was a German actor.

Stocker appeared in the 1987 American television film The Dirty Dozen: The Deadly Mission.

Highlander: The Series

Werner Stocker also featured in the fantasy hit Highlander: The Series as Darius, a 2,000-year-old immortal priest.

The script of the episode "Band of Brothers" describes Darius as a monk with a "hideously ugly face", but when the producers cast the part, they chose Stocker, who did not fit this description. Creative Consultant David Abramovitz explains, "Darius, originally in the script, was written as almost to look like the Hunchback of Notre Dame, to be physically ugly and with a glorious soul. And when I got to France, I noticed that they cast this young, handsome German actor named Werner Stocker. I said, 'Wait a minute. What's going on here? He's supposed to be ugly.' And it seemed that the Germans, who were putting up a great deal of money, didn't want the only German actor in the show to be ugly; so he wasn't ugly. And this was one of the cases where politics won out and it didn't hurt anything because he was wonderful in the part."

Associate Creative Consultant Donna Lettow says about Darius' character development, "It was always planned that Darius would die in "The Hunters". The original plan for Darius was that he would reappear in flashbacks, much like Fitzcairn does now." Abramovitz confirms, "Darius would have played a bigger part in the show, but Werner passed away." Stocker's unexpected illness effectively prevented this. Producer Bill Panzer remembers that Stocker "had announced that he had a brain tumor," and that it happened "before we started shooting ["The Hunters"], just before. It involved a tremendous amount of rewriting." The season 1 promotional booklet recounts, "Just days before going into production actor Werner Stocker was stricken ill and was unable to work. By now the character of Darius had become an integral part of the story and the writers had to scramble to adjust the story line." Abramovitz recalls, "This was the episode when we learned that Werner Stocker was extremely ill. (...) I got a call at three o'clock in the morning, saying Werner would not be available, we were shooting in a day and a half, and there was fear if we were going to have to shut down. I went into work, wrote twenty-five straight hours, without a break, and got out a script and the show went on and it turned out pretty well." The promotional booklet further says, "Footage from previous episodes was successfully used to fill in for the absent actor and the season finale went on to mark a huge shift in the Highlander saga, forever altering the future of the series with the introduction of "Hunters" and "Watchers"."

Commenting on Stocker's performance as Darius, Abramovitz says, "He had an elegance, presence, and I was happy with the episode "Band of Brothers"." Adrian Paul thinks, "[He] had a very ethereal quality himself and I think Werner played [Darius] very well." The promotional booklet reports that Darius was "played with soulful grace by (...) Stocker. Stocker was an instant hit with fans." Stocker died on May 27, 1993 of a brain tumor. The episodes "Unholy Alliance" and "Unholy Alliance Part Two" are dedicated to him.

Awards
1983  (Deutscher Darstellerpreis) as Best Young Actor
1988 Bavarian Film Award (Bayerischer Filmpreis) shared with Dana Vávrová for Herbstmilch, Best Young Actors
1989 German Film Award in Gold shared with Dana Vávrová

Filmography 
 1977 - Les rebelles (TV miniseries)
 1980 - SOKO 5113 (TV series) "Rosis Brüder" Part 1 and Part 2
 1981 - Exil, directed by Egon Günther (TV miniseries)
 1982 - Die Weiße Rose, directed by Michael Verhoeven … Christoph Probst
 1982 - Die fünfte Jahreszeit (TV miniseries) … Leopold Perwanger 
 1984 - Derrick (TV series) - Season 11, Episode 02: "Die Verführung" … Willi Stein
 1984 - Abenteuer aus dem Englischen Garten, directed by Margit Saad (TV film) … Emil 
 1984 - , directed by Radu Gabrea … Walter/Armand
 1984 - Rambo Zambo, directed by Reinhard Donga (TV film) … Xaver
 1984 - The Old Fox (TV Series) - Episode 80: "Reihe 7 Grab 11" … Ludwig Huber
 1985 - Flight into Hell, directed by Gordon Flemyng (TV miniseries) … Adolph Klausmann
 1985 - , directed by  … Hoffmann 
 1986 - , directed by  … Tom
 1987 - The Dirty Dozen: The Deadly Mission, directed by Lee H. Katzin (TV film) … SS Sergeant
 1987 - Aquaplaning, directed by Eva Hiller (TV film) … Herrmann Ort
 1988 - Der Condor, directed by Jobst Oetzmann (Short)
 1988 - Ein Fall für zwei (TV Series) Episode 59: "Die einzige Chance" … Thomas Stelzer
 1989 - SOKO 5113 (TV series) "Der große Bruder" … Richard
 1989 - Herbstmilch, directed by Joseph Vilsmaier … Albert Wimschneider
 1990 - The Private War of Lucinda Smith, directed by Ray Alchin (TV miniseries) … Hans
 1991 - Lex Minister, directed by Peter Patzak
 1991 - , directed by Joseph Vilsmaier … Hans Stadler
 1991 - St. Petri Schnee, directed by Peter Patzak … Dr. Amberg
 1992 - Far from Berlin, directed by Keith McNally … Dieter Hausmann
 1992 - Shadows of Love, directed by Christoph Vorster … Tom
 1992 - Samba Syndrom, directed by Achim Lenz
 1992 - , directed by Clive Donner … Franz
 1993 - , with Dana Vávrová, directed by Radu Gabrea … Emil Lehmann
 1993 - Highlander (TV series)
The Hunters (1993) … Darius
Saving Grace (1993) … Darius
The Beast Below (1993) … Darius
For Tomorrow We Die (1993) … Darius
Band of Brothers (1993) … Darius

See also
List of brain tumor patients

References

External links

1955 births
1993 deaths
German male film actors
German male television actors
People from Rosenheim (district)
20th-century German male actors